Horst Eidenmüller (born 23 October 1963) is the Freshfields Professor of Commercial Law in the Faculty of Law at the University of Oxford and a Fellow of St. Hugh's.

Eidenmüller was born in Munich, Germany. He is a graduate of Ludwig Maximilian University of Munich and of Cambridge (LLM 1989). Prior to joining Oxford, Eidenmüller held professorships at the universities of Münster (1999-2003) and Munich (2003-2015). He was visiting professor at Cambridge (2007), Oxford (2009-2014), Harvard (2011), Tulane (2011), NYU (2013 and 2015), and Stanford (2015), as well as fellow of the Institute for Advanced Study, Berlin (2008-2009). Eidenmüller is a member of the Berlin-Brandenburg Academy of Sciences and Humanities (since 2008) and of the European Academy of Sciences and Arts (since 2016).

Eidenmüller's research focuses on commercial contracts, company law, insolvency law, and alternative dispute resolution. He is known for economic and empirical studies in these fields.

Publications
 Regulating the Closed Corporation. de Gruyter, 2013,  (co-author with Gregor Bachmann, Andreas Engert, Holger Fleischer, and Wolfgang Schön). German edition under the title Rechtsregeln für die geschlossene Kapitalgesellschaft. de Gruyter, 2012  
 "Recht als Produkt", Juristenzeitung 64 (2009), 641
 "Abuse of Law in the Context of European Insolvency Law", European Company and Financial Law Review 6 (2009), 1
 Ausländische Kapitalgesellschaften im deutschen Recht. C. H. Beck, 2004,  (co-author with Andreas Engert, Markus Rehberg, and Gebhard Rehm)
 Unternehmenssanierung zwischen Markt und Gesetz: Mechanismen der Unternehmensreorganisation und Kooperationspflichten im Reorganisationsrecht. Otto Schmidt, 1999, 
 Effizienz als Rechtsprinzip. Möglichkeiten und Grenzen der ökonomischen Analyse des Rechts. Mohr Siebeck, 4th ed. 2015, 
 Negotiating Brexit. Beck-Hart-Nomos, 2017,  (co-edited with John Armour)

References

External links
 Faculty Profile
 Personal website — includes list of publications

Living people
1963 births
Fellows of St Hugh's College, Oxford
Statutory Professors of the University of Oxford
Legal scholars of the University of Oxford
Jurists from Bavaria
Ludwig Maximilian University of Munich alumni
Alumni of the University of Cambridge